Lisa Park may refer to:

 Lisa Park (Stargate), a character on Stargate Universe
 Lisa Park (artist), interdisciplinary artist